Phöbus Futball Club was a Hungarian football club from the town of Budapest.

History
Phöbus FC debuted in the 1936–37 season of the Hungarian League and finished fourth.

Name Changes 
1932–1939: Phöbus FC
1939–1950: Phöbus Sportegyesület
1950: merger with Elektromos FC

References

External links
 Profile

Football clubs in Hungary
Defunct football clubs in Hungary
1932 establishments in Hungary